The 103rd Separate Brigade of the Territorial Defense Forces of the Armed Forces of Ukraine is a military formation of the Territorial Defense Forces of Ukraine. It is part of Operational Command West. The brigade is participating in the defense against the 2022 Russian invasion of Ukraine in the country's east.

History 
On 16 October 2018, as part of a working trip to Lviv Oblast, the then President, Petro Poroshenko took part in several events dedicated to the Day of Territorial Defense Soldiers, which took place at the International Center for Peacekeeping and Security.  Poroshenko inspected the bases used for training territorial defence battalions, in particular the personnel of the 64th Territorial Defense Battalion of the 103rd Independent Territorial Defense Brigade of the Lviv Oblast.

From 17 to 20 July 2019, about two hundred reserve officers of the brigade underwent combat training at the International Center for Peacekeeping and Security.

During the Kharkiv counteroffensive, both the 103rd and 113th Territorial Defense Brigades conducted attacks along the P07 road into Chkalovske and Shevchenkove, supporting the Balakliia axis of advance as well as enabling elements of the 25th Airborne Brigade and 80th Air Assault Brigade to recapture Kupiansk.

Ukrainian President Zelensky thanked the 103rd Lviv Defense Brigade, which is responsible for the liberation of Yampil in the Donetsk region, in his evening video message on September 30.

Structure 

 Headquarters
 62nd Territorial Defense Battalion (Lviv)
 63rd Territorial Defense Battalion (Kamianka-Buzka)
 64th Territorial Defense Battalion (Brody)
 65th Territorial Defense Battalion (Stryi) 
 66th Territorial Defense Battalion (Yavoriv)
 67th Territorial Defense Battalion (Drohobych)
 Counter-Sabotage Company
 Engineering Company
 Communication Company
 Logistics Company
 Mortar Battery

Commanders 
 Lieutenant Colonel Mykola Andrushchak (2018)
 Colonel Valerii Kurko (2022)

See also 
 Territorial Defense Forces of the Armed Forces of Ukraine

References 

Territorial defense Brigades of Ukraine
2018 establishments in Ukraine
Military units and formations established in 2018